The president of Colombia, officially known as the president of the Republic of Colombia or president of the nation is the head of state and head of government of Colombia. The office of president was established upon the ratification of the Constitution of 1819, by the Congress of Angostura, convened in December 1819, when Colombia was the "Gran Colombia". The first president, General Simón Bolívar, took office in 1819. His position, initially self-proclaimed, was subsequently ratified by Congress.

The current president of the Republic of Colombia is Gustavo Petro, who took office on 7 August 2022.

Functions 
According to the Colombian Constitution of 1991, Article 188, the president of Colombia is the head of state, head of government and Supreme Administrative Authority. The president of Colombia symbolizes the National Unity, and after taking an oath to the Constitution of Colombia and swearing to defend and protect the nation's laws, he is charged to guarantee and protect the rights and liberties of all Colombian nationals.

The Administrative Department of the Presidency of Colombia has the commission to assist or support the president of Colombia on its constitutional mandated functions and legal issues.

Article 115 states that the National Government is formed by the president of Colombia, the vice president of Colombia, the Council of Ministers of the Republic of Colombia and the Directors of the Administrative Departments of Colombia. Any official from these entities constitute the Government of Colombia in any particular business.

Any act by the president of Colombia, in order to be legal and enforceable, must be sanctioned by any of the ministries or department directors, who will also be held responsible for the act. The only exception is if the president appoints or removes ministers, administrative departments' directors and any other officials appointed by him under his administrative authority. Governors of the Departments of Colombia, mayors of Municipalities of Colombia, as well as regional superintendents of Colombia, public establishments and industrial and commercial state owned enterprises, are all part of the executive branch of Colombia.

General description 
The Colombian Constitution of 1991, coupled with several articles of amendment, establishes the requirements an eligible candidate must meet in order to become president, as well as the term of office, method of election, and powers.

Requirements for holding 
Colombian Constitution of 1991 Article 191: states that the president must be a natural born citizen of Colombia and at least 30 years of age.

Term of office and election 

The president and vice president serve a term of office of four years after being elected by popular vote. Since 2015, the president is barred from running for reelection, even for a nonconsecutive term.

From 1910 to 2005, the president was limited to a single term. However, on 24 November 2005, the Colombian Congress introduced the Electoral Guarantees Law (Ley de Garantias Electorales), which modified Article 152, of the Colombian Constitution of 1991 and allowed a president to run for a second term. The President or Vice President running for re-election was required to formally notify the National Electoral Council and guarantee a fair competition for the other contenders. Participation of acting officials in political proselytism was standardized. Presidents or vice presidents not running for office were barred from participating on political proselytism. If one or both were running, they could only engage in political activity four months before the primary elections. Also, if the president and/or vice president were running for office, they could participate in their political party's selection mechanism to postulate candidates. In 2010, the Constitutional Court of Colombia threw out a planned referendum to allow presidents to run for three consecutive terms. It ruled that Colombian presidents could only serve two terms, even if they are nonconsecutive. In 2015, a constitutional amendment repealed the 2004 changes and reverted to the original one-term limit.

Line of succession

Further succession 
In absence of both the president and the vice president, Article 203 of the Constitution of 1991 establishes that the presidential office will be assumed by a minister in the order of precedence established by law. The assuming minister has to be a member of the same party or movement the original president belonged to, and will exercise the presidency until the Congress, within the 30 days following the presidential vacancy, elects a new vice president who will assume the presidency.

References

External links 
 Presidencia de la Republica de Colombia 
 Georgetown University – Requisites to be President of Colombia

 
Government of Colombia
Presidency of Colombia
1819 establishments in Gran Colombia